Dániel Lengyel (born 1 March 1989 in Budapest) is a retired Hungarian football player.

External links
 http://www.UEFA.com
 Hungarian Football Federation
 MTK Hungária FC
 Szombathelyi Haladás

1989 births
Living people
Footballers from Budapest
Hungarian footballers
Association football defenders
MTK Budapest FC players
Szombathelyi Haladás footballers
BFC Siófok players
Békéscsaba 1912 Előre footballers
Gyirmót FC Győr players
Nemzeti Bajnokság I players